Jonathan Girard (born April 25, 1978) is an American-Canadian born conductor based in Vancouver, British Columbia, Canada.

Education
Girard received a Doctor of Musical Arts degree in orchestral conducting from the Eastman School of Music after study with conductor Neil Varon. Girard completed his Bachelor of Music degree at the Hartt School of Music in West Hartford, Connecticut and his Master of Music degree in orchestral conducting at Boston University.

Career
Girard currently teaches conducting and is the Director of Orchestras at the University of British Columbia School of Music, a post to which he was appointed in 2012. Girard served as the assistant conductor of the Ohio Light Opera from 2012-2014. Girard was the Visiting Artist Conductor at the University of Northern Iowa School of Music in 2010-2011 and has held positions as the music director of the New Eastman Outreach Orchestra and Waltham Philharmonic (MA), associate conductor of the Brockton Symphony Orchestra (MA), principal guest conductor of the Boston Orpheus Ensemble and assistant conductor of the Portland (ME) Opera Repertory Theatre. In 2015, Girard joined the faculty of the Vancouver Symphony Orchestra Institute at Whister as the assistant conductor working with VSO music director Bramwell Tovey. Also in 2015, Girard made his European operatic conducting debut with the North Czech Philharmonic Orchestra (Severočeská Filharmonie) conducting Le Nozze di Figaro.

Girard has brought the UBC Symphony Orchestra to national and international prominence during his tenure through notable performances and recordings. In 2013, Girard conducted the UBC Symphony Orchestra in a performance with soloist Dame Elaine Paige at the International Women's Forum in Vancouver. Girard led the world premiere of the opera Choir Practice by composer Stephen Chatman in May 2015.  As the conductor of the UBC Symphony Orchestra, he led the orchestra on its first tour of Western Canada with violinist David Gillham in 2014. In 2013, he led a sold-out performance of Stravinsky's The Rite of Spring to commemorate the 100th anniversary of the work.  In 2015, the UBC Symphony Orchestra was listed as one of the "Top Classical Ensembles" in the "Stars of Vancouver" by the Vancouver Courier.

Discography
"Magnificat" – Jonathan Girard (conductor), UBC Symphony Orchestra and UBC University Singers, Bahareh Poureslami (soprano) (2013). Centrediscs CD 1606  (Nominated for Best Classical Composition of the Year at the Juno Awards, 2014) (Nominated for Best Classical Composition of the Year, at the Western Canadian Music Awards, 2014)
"Choir Practice: A Comic Opera in One Act " – Jonathan Girard (conductor), UBC Symphony Orchestra and Members of the UBC Symphony Orchestra (2016). Stephen Chatman, composer, Tara Wohlberg, librettist. Centrediscs CD 1708

References

1978 births
American male conductors (music)
Eastman School of Music alumni
Boston University College of Fine Arts alumni
University of Hartford Hartt School alumni
Academic staff of the University of British Columbia
Living people
21st-century American conductors (music)
20th-century American conductors (music)
20th-century American male musicians
21st-century American male musicians